"Airwaves" is a song recorded by Canadian country music artist Brett Kissel, released June 19, 2015 as the first single from his sixth studio album, Pick Me Up (2015). It peaked at number one on the Billboard Canada Country chart, his first chart-topper.

Composition
"Airwaves" is a midtempo country song written by Zach Crowell, Matt Jenkins, and Jonathan Singleton. The song also incorporates elements of pop and rock genres. According to the digital sheet music published by Atlas Music Publishing, "Airwaves" is composed in the key of E major with an approximate tempo of 114 BPM.

Critical reception
Kerry Doole of New Canadian Music praised the song's production and "catchy," radio-friendly sound. In his review of Pick Me Up, Markos Papadatos of Digital Journal described the song as "infectious" and wrote that it "lures the listener in from its first note."

Commercial performance
"Airwaves" entered the Billboard Canada Country airplay chart at number 31 for the week of July 6, 2015 and was the most-added single of the week. It reached the number one position on the chart dated October 3, 2015. The song also debuted at number 83 on the Billboard Canadian Hot 100 chart dated July 11, 2015, and has since peaked at number 61.

Music video
The music video was directed by Ben Knechtel and premiered in July 2015.

Chart performance

Certifications

References

2015 songs
2015 singles
Brett Kissel songs
Warner Music Group singles
Songs written by Zach Crowell
Songs written by Matt Jenkins
Songs written by Jonathan Singleton